Vavuniya railway station ( Vavuṉiyā toṭaruntu nilaiyam) is a railway station in the city of Vavuniya in northern Sri Lanka. Owned by Sri Lanka Railways, the state-owned railway operator, the station is part of the Northern Line which links the north with the capital Colombo. The popular Yarl Devi service calls at the station and the also popular service Rajarata Rejini terminates at the station, which starts at Matara in down south. No services operated north of Vavuniya after 1990 due to the civil war. Reconstruction of this section of the line commenced following the end of the civil war in 2009. Currently services operate up to KKS.

References

Railway station
Railway stations on the Northern Line (Sri Lanka)